The Petal on the Current is a lost 1919 American drama film directed by Tod Browning.

Plot
Based upon a description in a film magazine, Stella Schump (MacLaren) is a working girl who, on the advice of a friend Cora (Ridgeway), who is attempting to be a matchmaker, attends a party where she is supposed to meet a bashful man. He does not show up, and she has her first drink of beer. This affects her so she becomes dazed, and she leaves for home. A detective comes upon her, and after she repeats bits of conversation she heard at the party, he arrests her for being drunk and for solicitation. A night court convicts her and sentences her to ten days in jail. She writes her mother of her plight, and her mother (Claire) dies from shock upon reading the letter. After she is let out of jail, she loses her job and, after her money runs out, goes to a park and sits on a bench. A bashful man (Anderson), who is disillusioned about women, comes by. She has heard of him, but they have never met. He turns out to be a foreman at a factory, and as they talk they realize they were supposed to have met at the party. They leave together and marry.

Cast
 Mary MacLaren as Stella Schump
 Gertrude Claire as Stella's Mother
 Fritzi Ridgeway as Cora Kinealy (as Fritzie Ridgeway)
 Robert Anderson as John Gilley
 Beatrice Burnham as Gertie Cobb
 Victor Potel as Skinny Flint
 David Butler as Ed Kinealy
 Yvette Mitchell (uncredited)
 Janet Sully (uncredited)

References

External links

1919 films
1919 drama films
Silent American drama films
American silent feature films
American black-and-white films
Films directed by Tod Browning
Universal Pictures films
Lost American films
Films based on works by Fannie Hurst
1919 lost films
Lost drama films
1910s American films